The 2002–03 UNC Asheville Bulldogs men's basketball team represented the University of North Carolina at Asheville during the 2002–03 NCAA Division I men's basketball season. The Bulldogs, led by head coach Eddie Biedenbach, played their home games at the Justice Center and were members of the Big South Conference. They finished the season 15–17, 7–7 in Big South play to finish in fifth place. They defeated Elon, Winthrop, and Radford to become champions of the Big South tournament and receive the conference's automatic bid to the NCAA tournament  the first appearance in program history. The Bulldogs were one of two No. 16 seeds in the South region, defeating Texas Southern to reach the field of 64. UNC Asheville was eliminated in the first round by No. 1 seed and eventual Final Four participant Texas.

Roster

Schedule and results

|-
!colspan=9 style=| Regular season

|-
!colspan=9 style=| Big South tournament

|-
!colspan=9 style=| NCAA tournament

References

UNC Asheville Bulldogs men's basketball seasons
UNC Asheville
UNC Asheville
Asheville
Asheville